The USA Rugby Sevens Collegiate National Championships is an annual competition among the top college rugby teams in the country to decide a national champion in rugby sevens. USA Rugby organized the championship to capitalize on the surge in popularity of rugby sevens following the 2009 announcement of the addition of rugby to the Summer Olympics. USA Rugby recognized that rugby sevens is growing in popularity, participation and interest. At the time of the foundation of the tournament, rugby was one of the fastest growing sports across college campuses. This tournament is a major contributor to the selection process for USA Rugby Olympic athletes.

History
USA Rugby announced in September 2011 the creation of a new sevens tournament. The launch by USA Rugby had a few hiccups.  USA Rugby did not officially announce the December 16–17, 2011 tournament and its dates until September 2011, and at that time USA Rugby had still not determined the location. Those mid-December dates were in the middle of exams for some schools. College Station, Texas, was ultimately announced as the venue in November. College Station lacks direct flight to many major cities, and this problem was compounded by the decision to hold the tournament over a Friday and Saturday, requiring students to miss both a Thursday and Friday. For these reasons, many colleges that qualified or were invited to the tournament—such as Penn State, UCLA, Utah, BYU, Boston College, Navy, LSU, Iowa, Dartmouth, Delaware, Cal, and Bowling Green—declined to participate.

The inaugural 2011 tournament was contested by 24 teams that qualified based on performance in qualifying tournaments throughout the fall of 2011.  The 2011 tournament was won by Life University, defeating Central Washington 22–17 in overtime. Tim Stanfill of Central Washington was the tournament MVP, and Derek Patrick of Miami was the tournament's leading try scorer.

The 2012 tournament was more organized, with only one team - UCLA - declining to participate in the tournament. The 2012 tournament also saw increased airtime, with the entire tournament available live via webstream and some of the knockout rounds broadcast on ESPN3.

For the 2013 tournament, three teams—Cal, BYU, and UCLA—won bids but declined to participate.

The 2015 tournament was held in May — unlike previous tournaments which had been held in December. The tournament took place in Denver over the weekend of May 23–24, less than one week before the 2015 Collegiate Rugby Championship in Philadelphia. Once again, several top teams did not play: BYU, California, Life University, and UCLA.

Results

Championships

Television Ratings

Players

Qualifying tournaments
The following rugby sevens tournaments, played throughout the fall season preceding the national championships, serve as the qualifying events for the national championships. The winner of each qualifying tournament earns an automatic berth in the national championships. The rest of the places in the national championships are awarded to at large bids chosen by a selection panel.

Legend
 — Champions
 — Champions
 — Runners-up
 — Third place
 — Fourth place

Notes:
 Team in italics declined to participate in the championship tournament or were not invited for team-specific issues.
 An asterisk indicates that the tournament was not held or was not an automatic qualifier that year.
 The Cougar Invitational was called the Rocky Mountain 7s in 2012 and the Mountain 7s in 2011.
 The Allied 7s was known as the Oklahoma 7s in 2011 prior to the formation of the Allied Rugby Conference.

See also
 College rugby
 Collegiate Rugby Championship
 Intercollegiate sports team champions
 USA Rugby

References

External links

Rugby union
USA Rugby Sevens Collegiate National Championships
Rugby sevens competitions in the United States
College rugby union competitions in the United States
2011 establishments in the United States